Butterworth–Heinemann is a British publishing company specialised in professional information and learning materials for higher education and professional training, in printed and electronic forms. It was formed in 1990 by the merger of Heinemann Professional Publishing and Butterworths Scientific, both subsidiaries of Reed International. With its earlier constituent companies, the founding dates back to 1923.

It has publishing units in Oxford (UK) and Waltham, Massachusetts (United States).

As of 2006, it is an imprint of Elsevier.

See also 
LexisNexis Butterworths

References

External links
 

Book publishing companies of the United Kingdom
Elsevier imprints